Château-Chinon is the name of two communes of the Nièvre département, in France:

 Château-Chinon (Ville)
 Château-Chinon (Campagne)

The two towns are neighboring each other. They were separated during the French Revolution.

See also
Chinon (disambiguation)

Geography of Nièvre